Nompumelelo may refer to:
Nompumelelo township of Hanover, Northern Cape
Nompumelelo township of Buffalo City Metropolitan Municipality